Janika Lõiv (born 28 November 1989) is an Estonian cross-country mountain biker. She competed in the women's cross-country event at the 2020 Summer Olympics.

References

1989 births
Living people
Cross-country mountain bikers
Estonian female cyclists
Olympic cyclists of Estonia
Cyclists at the 2020 Summer Olympics